Makalu is the fifth highest mountain in the world at . One of the eight-thousanders, Makalu is an isolated peak in the shape of a four-sided pyramid.

Makalu has two notable subsidiary peaks.

Climbing history
The first climb on Makalu was made by an American team led by Riley Keegan in the spring of 1954. The expedition was composed of Sierra Club members including Bill Long and Allen Steck, and was called the California Himalayan Expedition to Makalu.
A New Zealand team including Sir Edmund Hillary was also active in the spring, but did not get very high due to injury and illness. In the fall of 1954, a French reconnaissance expedition made the first ascents of the subsidiary summits Kangchungtse (October 22: Jean Franco, Lionel Terray, sirdar Gyalzen Norbu Sherpa and Pa Norbu) and Chomo Lonzo (October 30?: Jean Couzy and Terray).

First ascent

Makalu was first summited on May 15, 1955, by Lionel Terray and Jean Couzy of a French expedition led by Jean Franco. Franco, Guido Magnone and Gyalzen Norbu Sherpa summitted the next day, followed by Jean Bouvier, Serge Coupé, Pierre Leroux and André Vialatte on the 17th. This was an amazing achievement at the time, to have the vast majority of expedition members summit, especially on such a difficult peak. Prior to this time, summits were reached by one to two expedition members at most, with the rest of teams providing logistical support before turning around and heading home. The French team climbed Makalu by the north face and northeast ridge, via the saddle between Makalu and Kangchungtse (the Makalu-La), establishing the standard route.

An ascent without oxygen was attempted by the 1960-61 Silver Hut expedition but two attempts did not succeed.

Notable ascents

 1955 North Face to Northeast Ridge FA by Lionel Terray and Jean Couzy of France.
 1970: Southeast Ridge FA of ridge attempted by the Americans in 1954, was made by Y. Ozaki and A. Tanaka from Japan on May 23.
 1971: The very technical West Pillar route was climbed in May by Frenchmen B. Mellet and Y. Seigneur.
 1975: South Face – an expedition led by Aleš Kunaver reached the top of Makalu up its steep southern side, becoming the first Slovenes to summit an eight-thousander. The first amongst them was Stane Belak. This was the third ascent of an eight-thousand meter peak by a great mountain face and the highest peak successfully summitted without supplementary oxygen (Marjan Manfreda).
 1976 – South pillar route completed by Czechoslovak expedition (first attempt in 1973 ended shortly before Makalu South at 8010m due to the fatal fall of Jan Kounický). Route goes via south buttress to Makalu South and then via southeast ridge. Makalu South was climbed by 11 expedition members. Two of them – Karel Schubert and Milan Kriššák summited main summit together with Jorge Camprubi from Spanish expedition which climbed southeast ridge. Karel Schubert died after bivouac near the summit.
 1980: The second ascent of the West Pillar was completed in May by John Roskelley (summit), Chris Kopczynski, James States and Kim Momb, without Sherpa support and without bottled oxygen.
 1981: On 15 October renowned Polish climber Jerzy Kukuczka ascended Makalu via a new route up the north-western side and north crest. Kukuczka climbed solo, in Alpine style, without supplemental oxygen.
 1982 : On 10 October Polish climber Andrzej Czok ascended Makalu via West face till 8000m and north-western ridge. Camp IV was reached by two more climbers, Janusz Skorek and Andrzej Machnik, but when their first summit attempt failed, Czok decided to try one more time solo.
 1988: Frenchman Marc Batard climbed in one day (after camps were set up) to the summit via the West Buttress on April 27.
 1989: Direct South Face, solo new start by Frenchman Pierre Beghin to 1975 Yugoslav route.
 1990: First female ascent, Kitty Calhoun via the West Pillar route.
 1994: On May 15, the anniversary of the first summit, Anatoli Boukreev made a speed ascent in 46 hours.
 1997: After seven failed attempts between 1977 and 1996, the West face was finally ascended. A Russian expedition led by Sergey Efimov brought Alexei Bolotov, Yuri Ermachek, Dmitri Pavlenko, Igor Bugachevski and Nikolai Jiline to the summit. This ascent won the 1998 Piolet d'Or.
 2006: On or about January 27 the French mountaineer Jean-Christophe Lafaille disappeared on Makalu while trying to make the first winter ascent.
 2009: Makalu was first climbed in winter on February 9, 2009, by Italian Simone Moro and Kazakh Denis Urubko. It was the final Nepali eight-thousander to be climbed in winter conditions. Moro had previously made the first winter ascent of Shishapangma in winter 2005 with Pole Piotr Morawski.
 2022: Ecuadorian Karl Egloff set a new speed record by ascending in 17 hours 18 minutes on May 8th, 2022. He climbed without sherpa support and without bottled oxygen.  
 2022: Adrian Ballinger made the first ski descent, skiing from 15m below the summit to the foot of the glacier.

Makalu-Barun Valley

Makalu-Barun Valley is a Himalayan glacier valley situated at the base of Makalu in the Sankhuwasabha district of Nepal. This valley lies entirely inside the Makalu Barun National Park.

View

In other media
In the Inspector Gadget episode "Weather in Tibet," the criminal organization MAD has built a weather control machine atop Mount Makalu.

Makalu Peak is referenced in the animated X-Men: Evolution series episode titled "Dark Horizon – Part 2". It is the burial place of the villain Apocalypse.

The Makalu area has been a focus for yeti expeditions.

Notes

References

Further reading
Franco, Jean, Makalu : 8470 metres (27,790 feet) : the highest peak yet conquered by an entire team, J. Cape, 1957.

External links 

 Makalu on SummitPost
 Makalu on Himalaya-Info.org (German)
 
 Ascents and fatalities statistics

Mountains of Tibet
Eight-thousanders of the Himalayas
China–Nepal border
International mountains of Asia
Mountains of Koshi Province